The National House is a historical building in Prostějov in the Czech Republic. It was built for cultural and social purposes. It is a significant cultural monument of the city.

History
The National House was designed by the Czech architect Jan Kotěra. It was built in Art Nouveau style in 1905–1907.

Many famous artists collaborated on designing the building, such as painters František Kysela and Jan Preisler, and sculptors Stanislav Sucharda, Vojtěch Sucharda and Karel Petr.

References

Art Nouveau architecture in the Czech Republic
Buildings and structures in Prostějov
Buildings and structures completed in 1907